The NAACP Image Award for Outstanding Variety Special: began as a category in 1994 after being part of the larger category Outstanding Variety Series/Special from 1988 to 1993. It ceased in 1996 when the category reverted to the original Outstanding Variety Series/Special.

Winners & Nominees

References

NAACP Image Awards